Not in My Name is an EP by Saul Williams, released in May 2003.

Track listing
"The Pledge" (Live @ Central Park)
"September 12th"
"Bloodletting"
"The Pledge" (Remix) (DJ Goo)
"Not in Our Name" (Remix) (DJ Spooky)
"The Pledge" (Ill Bootleg MP3 Remix) (DJ Spooky)
"The Pledge" (Remix) (Coldcut)
"Give Blood" (Phantom Dancehall Mix) (DJ Spooky)

See also
 List of anti-war songs

References

Saul Williams albums
2003 EPs